Robert Reid Power Plant is a coal-fired power plant owned and operated by the Big Rivers Electric Cooperation as part of Sebree Station. It is located in the northeast corner Webster County, Kentucky (just south of the Anaconda Aluminum plant in Henderson County).  The plant obtains much of its fuel from coal mines located within just a few miles of the plant itself.

Emissions Data 
 CO2 Emissions: 438,984 tons (2005)
 SO2 Emissions: 9,280 tons (2005)
 SO2 Emissions per MWh: 60.37 lb/MWh
 NOx Emissions: 1,097 tons (2005)

See also 

 Coal mining in Kentucky

References

External links 
 https://web.archive.org/web/20110708000321/http://www.bigrivers.com/locations.aspx

Energy infrastructure completed in 1966
Coal-fired power plants in Kentucky
Buildings and structures in Webster County, Kentucky